Fred Lee Scruggs Jr. (born April 18, 1971), better known by his stage name Fredro Starr, is an American rapper and actor best known as a member of the hardcore rap group Onyx. Fredro Starr was discovered by the late hip hop star Jam Master Jay of Run-D.M.C. who signed Onyx on his label JMJ Records. Onyx went on to release three top selling albums before Fredro began his solo career. As a part of Onyx, Fredro Starr was nominated as "Favorite Rap/Hip-Hop New Artist" on American Music Awards of 1994 and won "Best Rap Album" on 1994 Soul Train Music Awards.

Fredro Starr has starred in more than 55 films and television shows. He made his acting debut in the HBO drama Strapped. His film credits include Spike Lee's Clockers, Sunset Park, Ride, Light It Up, Save the Last Dance and Torque.  He also performed the Save the Last Dance'''s theme song, "Shining Through", with Jill Scott on the multi-platinum soundtrack.

Starr made his television debut in Law & Order and New York Undercover, but he is best known for his role of Quentin 'Q' Brooks in Moesha starring R&B singer Brandy. He also appeared in HBO's The Wire, NYPD Blue, Blade, and CSI: Miami. Fredro also co-hosted Dance 360, a daily, half-hour urban dance competition show on Paramount Television.

Early life
Fred Lee Scruggs Jr. was born in Kings County Hospital Center on April 18, 1971. He grew up in Flatbush, Brooklyn. In 1984, at the age of 13, he moved with his brother David Scruggs (also known as Who$ane) to South Jamaica, Queens. Between 1984 and 1988, Fredro Starr studied at John Adams High School (Queens). Other students at John Adams High School included Marlon Fledtcher (also known as Big DS), Tyrone Taylor (also known as Suave and Sonny Seeza), Mr. Cheeks and Freaky Tah. Fredro first met Suave at the battle in Ajax Park (Jamaica, New York) (now called "Dr. Charles R. Drew Park").

Music career

1984–1988: Career beginnings
Fred started out doing breakdancing after watching the movie "Beat Street" (1984), he was known by the name Magic.

In late 1985 Fredro Starr decided to become a street poet after watching the movie "Krush Groove" (1985). He was inspired by the style of LL Cool J.

For the first time, Fredro picked up a microphone in 1986 on the basketball court in the Baisley Park in Queens where he rhymed with his friends Cocheeks (also known as Mr. Cheeks), Freaky Tah, Dot-a-Rock, Spank G and Panama P.I. (also known as Big Prince) under live mixes of GrandMasta Vic and CutMasta JT. In this place were usually held jams, and often there were shoot-outs, but this did not stop anyone. Fredro was then known as Kool Fredro. In an interview with Brian Coleman, Fredro Starr remembers:

In 1986, Fred started working at "Nu Tribe Barbershop" on Jamaica Avenue in Queens. His younger cousin Kirk Jones (also known as Sticky Fingaz) joined him as a barber three years later after moving from Brooklyn to Queens. At "Nu Tribe Barbershop" Fred had to cut local drug dealers from Supreme Team (gang), as well as celebrities such as Kool G Rap, Rakim, Big Daddy Kane and others. In this barbershop Fred and Kirk made money until they heard on the radio their song "Throw Ya Gunz" in November 1992.

At the same time Fredro along with his cousin Kirk Jones, then known as Trop, visited the nightclubs of New York. The guys wore green dreadlocks and dressed in Dr. Martens boots. In an interview with Unkut, hip hop artist B-1 described his friendship with Fredro and Sticky:

Onyx
In 1988, after graduating from school at the age of 17, Fredro Starr created the rap group Onyx along with his schoolmates Big DS and Suavé (also known as Sonny Seeza). Big DS came up with the name for the group, he named it after the black stone Onyx. They began to make the first demos in the basement of B-Wiz with drum machine beats from an SP-12.

In 1989, Onyx signed Jeffrey Harris as their manager, who helped them secure a contract with the label Profile Records. In 1990, at York Studio in Brooklyn, they recorded their first single, "Ah, And We Do It Like This", which was released to low sales on April 25, 1990, on Profile.

Fredro Starr, Big DS and Suave (also known as Sonny Seeza) met Jam Master Jay in a traffic jam at The Jones Beach GreekFest Festival on July 13, 1991. Jay give them about two months to get a demo, but Suave and Big DS they didn't make it to the studio because they were stranded in Connecticut. So Jeff Harris, the manager of Onyx, asked Fredro to come to the studio with his cousin, Kirk Jones, who at the time was doing a solo career under the name Trop and working in the barbershop making a thousand dollars a week cutting high school. Fredro and Sticky Fingaz made two records, "Stik 'N' Muve" and "Exercise".
Jam Master Jay liked these songs and that's how Sticky joined the group, because Jay said, “If Sticky ain't in the group, it ain't no group!”. Jay signed the group to his label, JMJ Records, for a single deal, then for an EP deal followed by an album deal because they did 10 songs on a budget of 6 songs.

In 1991, despite the reproaches from Fredro, the Onyx's music producer, B-Wiz, sold his drum machine SP-12 and went to Baltimore to sell crack, and eventually he was killed in Baltimore. Thus, all Onyx records were lost.

In 1993, Onyx released their debut album entitled "Bacdafucup". It proved to be a commercial success and eventually went multi-platinum, largely due to the well known single "Slam". Then Onyx released on JMJ Records another two albums: All We Got Iz Us and Shut 'Em Down.

Solo career
In 2000, Fredro Starr signed a deal with Koch Records and released a mixtape "Firestarr" (Hosted & Mixed by DJ Clue) in the same year. In the following year he released his debut album "Firestarr". From this moment, another nickname is established behind him: Firestarr. Alongside Jill Scott, he  contributed to the soundtrack of Save the Last Dance for the lead single of the movie "Shining Through". Starr's next album, Don't Get Mad Get Money, arrived in 2003.

In 2003, Fredro Starr started a new movement "100 Mad". Sticky Fingaz came up with the term "100 Mad". It means the following: "No matter where in the world Onyx, there are always 100 crazy niggas with it". In 2019, "100 Mad" released an album, the title referring to Onyx's artist collective.  Production on the album included Snowgoons and The Alchemist, and guest vocalists included Conway The Machine, Tha God Fahim, Jay Nice, Planet Asia, Termanology and more.

In 2011, Fredro Starr founded his own label "Mad Money Movement" in Los Angeles. The first release of the label was his solo album "Made In The Streets", a collaboration album with producer Audible Doctor, which was dropped on December 25, 2013. Other releases include Onyx "#WAKEDAFUCUP" (2014), Onyx "Against All Authorities" (2015), ONYX "#WAKEDAFUCUP Reloaded" (2016), Onyx "#WAKEDAFUCUP Reloaded (Picture Disc Vinyl Import)" (2017), Onyx & Dope D.O.D. "Shotgunz In Hell" (2017), Onyx "Black Rock (Onyx album)" (2018)

On May 13, 2013, Starr released his mixtape and first solo project in 10 years entitled "Live 4Ever, Die 2Day". On November 26, 2013, Starr released his first single from his upcoming third album The Firestarr 2 entitled "What If 2". On January 8, 2014, he released the official video for the single.

On October 4, 2015, at the Milk River restaurant in Brooklyn was held a rap-battle between Fredro Starr and Keith Murray. On the results of 3 rounds, Fredro Starr won with a score of 3–0.

On March 9, 2018, Fredro Starr released his 4th solo album "Firestarr 2" on Mad Money Movement. In 2011, Fredro Starr announced via Twitter that he was working on the follow-up of his debut work. The album was due out in the summer of 2012, but later the release was postponed to the first half of 2013. In the end, the project was abandoned, as Fredro met producer Audible Doctor.

In 2020, Fredro Starr released a video "Fuck Corona" dedicated to the situation with the coronavirus in the United States. The single "Corona Freestyle" was released on April 17.

Yung Onyx
In 2006, Starr formed a new group called Yung Onyx, but the group later disbanded.

Acting career

Encouraged by his manager, Jeff Harris, to try his hand at acting, Fredro Starr began reading for roles and was immediately selected to co-star in a television pilot called B Boys (1992). Unfortunately, the project was soon abandoned. Less than a year later, he landed his first role as Bamboo in Forest Whitaker's critically acclaimed HBO film Strapped, which earned him a CableACE Award nomination for "Best Supporting Actor". Fredro Starr also starred in the critically acclaimed drama Clockers, and in Abel Ferrara's The Addiction. Starr moves into his first leading role as Shorty in Sunset Park. In addition to starring in Sunset Park, Fredro co-wrote and performs the title track "Thangz Changed"

Other film credits include Ride, Light It Up, and Save the Last Dance.

On television, Starr had a regular role on Moesha as the title character's boyfriend and fiancé. He appeared in three episodes of HBO's The Wire as Marquis "Bird" Hilton. Starr co-hosted Paramount Domestic Television's daily half-hour urban dance competition, Dance 360, with actor Kel Mitchell. The program aired for one season in 2004 before being canceled due to poor ratings.

Starr also filmed guest appearances on NYPD Blue, Law & Order, Blade: The Series (in which Sticky Fingaz starred in the title role), and Promised Land. He played Ricky Gannon on a CSI: Miami episode that aired February 2, 2009, and appeared on New York Undercover in the episode entitled "Student Affairs."

Fredro producing a documentary about his mentor, Jam Master Jay, entitled Two Turntables and a Microphone: The Life and Death of Jam Master Jay and served as Executive Consultant on the Sticky Fingaz-directed Lionsgate hip hop musical feature film, A Day In The Life, which he also stars in.

Between 2009 and 2010, Starr starred in 12 episodes for the web series Tales Of The Industry. Director: Sanz Pareil TV (Sanz Pareil & Brian "BK" Kim).

In 2012, Starr starred in 20 episodes for the web series 16 Bars with Fredro Starr. Director: Myster DL.

Starr plays the lead in the independent feature-length film Diamond Ruff, which had its premiere in Hartford, Connecticut on November 1, 2013.

In 2018, was filmed the movie Firestarr 2, consisting of video clips for songs from the album Firestarr 2.

Other career
In 2011, Fredro Starr released two children's books: "Lil Freddy: The Red Sock" and "Lil Freddy: The Bully Kid".

Controversy

50 Cent
The beef between Onyx and 50 Cent started on Def Jam's "Survival Of The Illest" concert at the legendary world-famous Apollo Theater. The concert was held on July 18, 1998. During performing the song "React" rapper Scarred 4 Life (also known as Clay Da Raider) performed 50 Cent's verse. A few years later according to the Rap News Network, 50 Cent started a confrontation with Starr at the 2003 Vibe Awards. In a 2003 interview Fredro Starr explained, "50 Cent basically started shit with me, started a scuffle, and a bodyguard broke us up. He's a punk. He's disrespectful to Jam Master Jay ever since he passed." In an interview with The Source, Fredro Starr said that 50 Cent had been disrespectful towards the Onyx rap group even though Onyx had given him his first breakthrough on a song called "React" from the 1998 album, Shut 'Em Down. In a 2008 interview for AllHipHop Fredro made a comment about 50 Cent.

Brandy
In an 2008 interview for C.O.D DVD (now called Forbez DVD) Fredro talked about relations with R&B singer Brandy, but later said "I never meant to put her on blast and say she gave me head. It was a joke and the media ran with it. That's what it was."

DMX
On September 18, 2012, Fredro Starr dropped a freestyle that was aimed at fellow pioneer New York City rapper DMX. On September 26, 2012, during a radio interview DMX responded to the diss.

Personal life
His cousin and fellow Onyx group member is Sticky Fingaz. Fredro Starr has 3 children, with his wife, Croatian model Korina Longin, whom he married in 2007.

Discography

Studio albums
 Firestarr (2001)
 Don't Get Mad Get Money (2003)
 Made In The Streets (2013)
 Firestarr 2 (2018)

Compilation albums
 Soul On Fire (2021)

Mixtapes
 Firestarr (Mix-Tape) (Hosted & Mixed by DJ Clue) (2000)
 Live 4ever Die 2day (2013)

Awards and nominations

Filmography

Films

Television

 Music videos 

Video games
 Rap Jam: Volume One (1995) as Fredro Starr

Bibliography
 Slam: Let the Boyz B Boyz'' (TBA)

References

External links

Fredro Starr at RapGenius

1971 births
Living people
African-American male actors
African-American male rappers
American male television actors
People from Queens, New York
African-American songwriters
Songwriters from New York (state)
Rappers from Brooklyn
Rappers from New York City
21st-century American male actors
Male actors from New York City
Hardcore hip hop artists
21st-century African-American musicians
21st-century American rappers
21st-century American male musicians
John Adams High School (Queens) alumni
People from Flatbush, Brooklyn
20th-century African-American people
American male songwriters